Carol Bouvard (born 12 January 1998) is a Swiss freestyle skier.

She participated at the FIS Freestyle Ski and Snowboarding World Championships 2019, winning the gold medal in the Aerials team competition.

References

External links

1998 births
Living people
Swiss female snowboarders
21st-century Swiss women